Colin French (20 November 1916 – 27 March 1984) was an Australian water polo player. He competed in the men's tournament at the 1948 Summer Olympics. He also won the gold medal with the Australian team in the exhibition event at the 1950 British Empire Games.

References

1916 births
1984 deaths
Australian male water polo players
Olympic water polo players of Australia
Water polo players at the 1948 Summer Olympics
Sportspeople from Melbourne
People from Collingwood, Victoria
Commonwealth Games gold medallists for Australia
Water polo players at the 1950 British Empire Games